Talkington may refer to:

Institutions
 Talkington College of Visual & Performing Arts

People with the surname
 Amy Talkington
 Fiona Talkington

Places
 Talkington Township, Sangamon County, Illinois